Anna Sui Hluan  is a Burmese linguist, researcher, Christian preacher, and social activist. She is the current Second Lady of Myanmar and wife of Henry Van Thio, the incumbent Vice President of Myanmar.

Early life and education
Anna Sui Hluan was born in Chin State, Burma, into a family of Christian pastors, and grew up in Yangon. Her father, Rev. Ral Buai, was a preacher who founded the Apostolic Christian Bible College (ACBC). In 1988, many schools were closed due to nationwide protests, so she enrolled in a nearby Bible college instead. She is married to Henry Van Thio and has three children. When she gained a scholarship to study theology at the University of Otago, the family moved to New Zealand to live in the Dunedin suburb of North East Valley in 2011.

Career
In her years of research, social activism, and women leadership, Anna Sui Hluan has developed a vision for a progressive and prosperous Myanmar. She is a lecturer at the Myanmar Evangelical Graduate School of Theology. She worked as an assistant pastor and women's commission member of the Myanmar Evangelical Christian Fellowship for twelve years before becoming its president. She is the patron of the Dingdi Dream Organization that dedicated to assisting individuals and communities in Chin State.

On 30 March 2016 She became Second Lady of the country when her husband Henry Van Thio was sworn in as Second Vice President of Myanmar under the Constitution of Myanmar. She led the first Myanmar Women Leaders Program, which was held in Europe in 2019. She was named one of the most influential and talented Burmese women of the year 2019. She published the "Silence" in Translation in 2022.

Works
"Silence" in Translation (2022)

References 

Burmese women activists
Burmese human rights activists
21st-century Burmese women politicians
People from Chin State
Burmese people of Chin descent
Year of birth missing (living people)
Living people
University of Otago alumni